Cəlilli is a village and municipality in the Tovuz District of Azerbaijan. It has a population of 1,830.

References 

Populated places in Tovuz District